Festucalex prolixus is a species of marine fish of the family Syngnathidae. It is found in the Western Central Pacific, from the Sulu-Celebes Sea and around west Papua New Guinea, Indonesia, including Cenderawasih Bay. Very little is known about this species, but it is expected to be ovoviviparous and to feed on small crustaceans.

References

prolixus
Marine fish
Fish described in 1984